Rafael Cadenas (born 8 September 1958) is a Venezuelan footballer. He played in one match for the Venezuela national football team in 1979. He was also part of Venezuela's squad for the 1979 Copa América tournament.

References

External links
 

1958 births
Living people
Venezuelan footballers
Venezuela international footballers
Place of birth missing (living people)
Association football midfielders